is an asteroid, classified as near-Earth object and potentially hazardous asteroid of the Apollo group, approximately 400 meters in diameter. It was first observed on 10 March 2016, by the Pan-STARRS survey at Haleakala Observatory, Hawaii, United States.

Orbit 

 orbits the Sun at a distance of 1.0–2.7 AU once every 2 years and 6 months (918 days). Its orbit has an eccentricity of 0.48 and an inclination of 3° with respect to the ecliptic.

Torino scale 

It is currently rated at level 0 after being rated at level 1 on the Torino Scale by the NEODyS system. It was upgraded to level 1 on 25 March 2016 but downgraded on 30 March 2016. On the Sentry system it did not cross the threshold between the two levels, due to a lower computed impact probability. The observation arc was then increased to of 78 days.

When rated at Torino Scale level 1, there was a 0.0012% chance or a 1 in 83,000 chance of the asteroid colliding with the Earth, corresponding to a 99.9988% chance the asteroid will miss the Earth.  had been observed 14 times at the observatories Mauna Kea, Apache Point, Pan-STARRS 1 Haleakala and Magdalena Ridge Observatory.

 was subsequently removed from the list of possible impactors thanks to prediscovery observations found in the Pan-STARRS archive.

Observations
2016 EU85 was observed with the Spacewatch 1.8-meter telescopes and also the Vatican Advanced Technology Telescope.

See also
List of asteroid close approaches to Earth in 2016

References

External links 
 
 
 

Minor planet object articles (unnumbered)
20160310